Kevin Wyatt (born March 14, 1964) is a former American football defensive back. He played for the San Diego Chargers in 1986 and for the Kansas City Chiefs in 1987.

References

1964 births
Living people
American football defensive backs
Arkansas Razorbacks football players
San Diego Chargers players
Kansas City Chiefs players
National Football League replacement players